Kinship terminology is the system used in languages to refer to the persons to whom an individual is related through kinship. Different societies classify kinship relations differently and therefore use different systems of kinship terminology; for example, some languages distinguish between consanguine and affinal uncles ( i.e. the brothers of one's parents and the husbands of the sisters of one's parents, respectively), whereas others have only one word to refer to both a father and his brothers. Kinship terminologies include the terms of address used in different languages or communities for different relatives and the terms of reference used to identify the relationship of these relatives to ego or to each other.

Historical view
Anthropologist Lewis Henry Morgan (1818–1881) performed the first survey of kinship terminologies in use around the world. Though much of his work is now considered dated, he argued that kinship terminologies reflect different sets of distinctions. For example, most kinship terminologies distinguish between sexes (the difference between a brother and a sister) and between generations (the difference between a child and a parent). Moreover, he argued, kinship terminologies distinguish between relatives by blood and marriage (although recently some anthropologists have argued that many societies define kinship in terms other than blood).

However, Morgan also observed that different languages (and, by extension, societies) organize these distinctions differently. He proposed to describe kinship terms and terminologies as either descriptive or classificatory. When a descriptive term is used, it can only represent one type of relationship between two people, while a classificatory term represents one of many different types of relationships. For example, the word brother in English-speaking societies indicates a son of the same parent; thus, English-speaking societies use the word brother as a descriptive term.  A person's male first cousin could be the mother's brother's son, mother's sister's son, father's brother's son, father's sister's son, and so on; English-speaking societies therefore use the word cousin as a classificatory term.

Morgan discovered that a descriptive term in one society can become a classificatory term in another society.  For example, in some societies, one would refer to many different people as "mother" (the woman who gave birth to oneself, as well as her sister and husband's sister, and also one's father's sister). Moreover, some societies do not group together relatives which the English-speaking societies classify together. For example, some languages have no one-word equivalent to cousin, because different terms refer to one's mother's sister's children and to one's father's sister's children.

Six basic patterns of kinship
Armed with these different terms, Morgan identified six basic patterns of kinship terminologies:

Hawaiian kinship
Hawaiian kinship: the most classificatory; only distinguishes between sex and generation.  Thus, siblings and cousins are not distinguished (the same terms are used for both types of relatives).

Sudanese kinship
Sudanese kinship: the most descriptive; no two types of relatives share the same term.  Siblings are distinguished from cousins, and different terms are used for each type of cousin (i.e. father's brother's children, father's sister's children, mother's sister's children and mother's brother's children).

Eskimo kinship
Eskimo kinship: has both classificatory and descriptive terms; in addition to sex and generation, it also distinguishes between lineal relatives (those related directly by a line of descent) and collateral relatives (those related by blood, but not directly in the line of descent). Lineal relatives have highly descriptive terms; collateral relatives have highly classificatory terms.  Thus, siblings are distinguished from cousins, while all types of cousins are grouped together.  The system of English-language kinship terms falls into the Eskimo type.

Iroquois kinship and its variations
Iroquois kinship: has both classificatory and descriptive terms; in addition to sex and generation, it also distinguishes between siblings of opposite sexes in the parental generation. A genealogical relationship traced through a pair of siblings of the same sex is classed as a blood relationship, but one traced though a pair of siblings of the opposite sex can be considered an in-law relationship. In other words, siblings are grouped together with parallel cousins, while separate terms are used for cross-cousins.  Also, one calls one's mother's sister "mother" and one's father's brother "father".  However, one refers to one's mother's brother and one's father's sister by separate terms (often the terms for father-in-law and mother-in-law, since cross-cousins can be preferential marriage partners).

The basic principles of Crow and Omaha terminologies are symmetrical and opposite, with Crow systems having a matrilineal emphasis and Omaha systems a patrilineal emphasis.

Crow kinship
Crow kinship: like Iroquois, but further distinguishes between one's mother's side and one's father's side. Relatives on the mother's side of the family have more descriptive terms, and relatives on the father's side have more classificatory terms.  Thus, Crow kinship is like Iroquois kinship, with the addition that a number of relatives belonging to one's father's matrilineage are grouped together, ignoring generational differences, so that the same term is used for both one's father's sister and one's father's sister's daughter, etc.

Omaha kinship
Omaha kinship: like Iroquois, but further distinguishes between one's mother's side and one's father's side. Relatives on the mother's side of the family have more classificatory terms, and relatives on the father's side have more descriptive terms.  Thus, Omaha kinship is like Iroquois, with the addition that a number of relatives belonging to one's mother's patrilineage are grouped together, ignoring generational differences, so that the same term is used for both one's mother's brother and one's mother's brother's son, etc.

Tri-relational kin-terms 
A unique set of kin-terms common in some Australian Aboriginal languages are tri-relational—also called triangular, ternary, triadic and shared kin-terms—which encapsulate a set of relations between three distinct entities. Broadly, there are two kinds of tri-relational kin-terms. The more common is a Dual Propositus Tri-relational Kin-term which has one referent whose relationship is defined with respect to two anchor points (propositi) and from which the relation between the two propositi can be inferred. The less common are Tri-relational Dyadic Terms which reference a pair of related entities which (i.e., this dyad) is in some way to single propositus. 

Dual Propositus Tri-relational Kin-terms

Terms of this type can be found in Murrinh-patha and Bininj Kunwok. The speaker and the addressee form two distinct propositi (P) who have unique relations to the referent (R). An example in Murrinh-patha is the term yilamarna. This term refers to the speaker's brother, who is also the uncle of the addressee; it is therefore also encoded in this term that the addressee is the child of the speaker. The term could be elaborated thus:

 The person (R)  who is my (PSpeaker) brother who is your (PAddresse) uncle by virtue of you being my child.

In Bininj Kunwok, the kin-term nakurrng can be either a regular (i.e. bi-relational) or tri-relational kin-term depending on the context. In the case in the illustration, the difference marked by the position of the possessive pronoun ke which either marks the addressee as the sole propositus or allows for a tri-relational interpretation:

 The person (R) who is your (PAddressee) maternal uncle and who is my (PSpeaker) nephew by virtue of you being my grandchild.

Tri-relational Dyadic Terms

In this kind of tri-relation, two referents (R1,R2) form a dyad via some relation (commonly marriage), and this dyad is in turn related to the speaker (the propositus) in some way. An example of a tri-relational dyadic term can be found in Gooniyandi.  Marralangi one way of referring to a husband and wife pair is specific to when either the husband or the wife is the opposite-sex sibling of the speaker. The denotation of marralangi is thus:

 Those two (R1,R2) who are a married couple wherein the husband (R1) is my (female, PSpeaker) brother.

Group/dyadic kin terms and pronouns

Dyadic Kin-terms 
Australian Aboriginal languages tend to have extensive vocabularies for denoting kin-relations, including for referring to and addressing dyads and groups based on their relation to one another and/or to the speaker. For example, see below the complete inventory of group kin-terms in Bardi (note that some but not all of these are assessed with respect to the speaker as well and may thus be considered tri-relational dyadic terms:

The size of this dyadic kin-term inventory is not atypical of Australian languages. Though smaller, the Dyirbal dyadic kin-term inventory is also extensive (e and y stand for elder and younger):

In Murrinh-patha, nonsingular pronouns are differentiated not only by the gender makeup of the group, but also by the members' interrelation. If the members are in a sibling-like relation, a third pronoun (SIB) will be chosen distinct from the Masculine (MASC) and Feminine/Neuter (FEM).

Relative age
Some languages, such as Kannada, Telugu, Tamil, Turkish, Sinhalese, Chinese (see Chinese kinship), Japanese, Korean, Khmer, Malayalam, Vietnamese, Tagalog (Filipino), Hungarian, Bulgarian, Nepalese, and Nahuatl add another dimension to some relations: relative age. Rather than one term for "brother", there exist, for example, different words for "older brother" and "younger brother". In Tamil, an older male sibling is referred to as aṇṇā and a younger male sibling as thambi, whereas older and younger female siblings are called akkā and thangai respectively.
Languages which distinguish relative age may not have non-age relative kinship terms at all. In Vietnamese, all younger siblings are referred to with the ungendered term em, whereas older siblings are distinguished by sex: anh for males and chị for females.

Identification of alternating generations
Other languages, such as Chiricahua, use the same terms of address for alternating generations. So Chiricahua children (male or female) call their paternal grandmother -ch’iné, and likewise this grandmother will call her son's children -ch’iné. Similar features are seen also in Huichol, some descendant languages of Proto-Austronesian (e.g. Fordata, Kei, and Yamdena), Bislama, and Usarufa. Terms that recognize alternating generations and the prohibition of marriage within one's own set of alternate generation relatives (0, ±2, ±4, etc.) are common in Australian Aboriginal kinship.

The relative age and alternating-generations systems are combined in some languages.  For instance,
Tagalog borrows the relative age system of the Chinese kinship and follows the generation system of kinship. Philippine kinship distinguishes between generation, age and in some cases, gender.

Dravidian
Floyd Lounsbury described a possible seventh, Dravidian, type of terminological system; there is on-going discussion on whether this system is a sub-type of Iroquois or whether it is a distinct system that had been conflated with Iroquois in Morgan’s typology of kin-term systems. Both systems distinguish relatives by marriage from relatives by descent, although both are classificatory categories rather than being based on biological descent. The basic idea is that of applying an even/odd distinction to relatives that takes into account the gender of every linking relative for ego’s kin relation to any given person. A MFBD(C), for example, is a mother’s father’s brother’s daughter’s child. If each female link (M,D) is assigned a 0 and each male (F,B) a 1, the number of 1s is either even or odd; in this case, even. However, variant criteria exist. In a Dravidian system with a patrilineal modulo-2 counting system, marriage is prohibited with this relative, and a marriageable relative must be modulo-2 odd. There exists also a version of this logic with a matrilineal bias. Discoveries of systems that use modulo-2 logic, as in South Asia, Australia, and many other parts of the world, marked a major advance in the understanding of kinship terminologies that differ from kin relations and terminologies employed by Europeans.

The Dravidian kinship system involves selective cousinhood. One's father's brother's children and one's mother's sister's children are not cousins but brothers and sisters one step removed. They are considered consanguineous ( in Tamil), and marriage with them is strictly forbidden as incestuous. However, one's father's sister's children and one's mother's brother's children are considered cousins and potential mates ( in Tamil). Marriages between such cousins are allowed and encouraged. There is a clear distinction between cross cousins, who are one's true cousins and parallel cousins, who are, in fact, siblings.

In Tamil, however, only one's mother's brother is captioned with  before  because of the honor accorded this relationship.

Abbreviations for genealogical relationships
The genealogical terminology used in many genealogical charts describes relatives of the subject in question. Using the abbreviations below, genealogical relationships may be distinguished by single or compound relationships, such as BC for a brother's children, MBD for a mother's brother's daughter, and so forth.

B = Brother 
C = Child(ren) 
D = Daughter 
F = Father 
GC = Grandchild(ren) 
GP = Grandparent(s) 
H = Husband 
LA = In-law 
M = Mother 
P = Parent 
S = Son 
SI = Siblings
SP = Spouse 
W = Wife 
Z = Sister 
(m.s.) = male speaking 
(f.s.) = female speaking

See also
Cognatic kinship
Cousin
Dyadic kinship term
Family
Fictive kinship
Genealogical numbering systems
Irish kinship
Marriage
Numerical variation in kinship terms

References

Inline citations

Sources referenced

 Murdock, G. P. (1949). Social Structure. New York: Macmillan.
 Kryukov, M. V. (1968). Historical Interpretation of Kinship Terminology. Moscow: Institute of Ethnography, USSR Academy of Sciences.
 Pasternak, B. (1976). Introduction to Kinship and Social Organization. Englewood Cliffs, NJ: Prentice Hall.
 Pasternak, B., Ember, M., & Ember, C. (1997). Sex, Gender, and Kinship: A Cross-Cultural Perspective. Upper Saddle River, NJ: Prentice Hall.
 Saxena, R. T. (2012). A Sociolinguistic Study of Hindi and Telugu Kinship Terminology- Variations in the Number of Kinship Terms across the Languages: Linguistic, Social and Anthropological Perspectives. Germany: LAP Lambert Academic Publishing. A Sociolinguistic Study of Hindi and Telugu Kinship Terminology / 978-3-659-28451-9 / 9783659284519 / 3659284513

External links
Kin Naming Systems (part 1) and (part 2) - from Palomar College

 
Family
Kinship and descent
Anthropology